Jaquelín García Cruz (born 23 December 1997), is a Mexican professional football winger who currently plays for Querétaro of the Liga MX Femenil.

Club career

Pachuca
On 28 July 2017, García made her first appearance for Pachuca in a 3–0 victory against Pumas UNAM. On August 19
she scored her first two goals against Cruz Azul in a 1–9 away victory in the Azul Stadium.

International career
On 20 February 2018, García Cruz received her first call up to the National team.

Career statistics

Club

Honours

Club
Pachuca
 Copa MX Femenil (1): 2017

International
Mexico U17
 CONCACAF Women's U-17 Championship: 2013

References

External links
 

1997 births
Living people
Women's association football wingers
Mexican women's footballers
Footballers from Michoacán
Mexican footballers
Liga MX Femenil players
C.F. Pachuca (women) footballers
Club Universidad Nacional (women) footballers